Humans are the longest-lived hominid species, with a human named Jeanne Calment being the longest-lived hominid ever, at 122 years. Other members of the family Hominidae are shorter-lived. This article lists the oldest known individuals of each hominidae species.

Chimpanzees

† denotes age at death, or, if living, age as of 

Golden and Glitter (born 1998, wild living at Gombe Stream National Park, Tanzania) are the oldest known chimpanzee twins, at 20 years (as of 2018).

Gorillas

†This list includes all known individuals to have reached the age of 50 years or more. The average lifespan of a gorilla is 35–40 years. The 1 January will be given as the birthday to any individual whose exact birthdate isn't known.

Humans

Orangutans

† denotes age at death, or, if living, age as of January, 2017

References

 
Apes
 
Oldest animals